Married to the Mob is a soundtrack album for the 1988 film Married to the Mob.  It features early songs by Sinéad O'Connor and Chris Isaak as well as a Brian Eno cover of William Bell's soul classic "You Don't Miss Your Water".

Track listing
 "Jump in the River" - Sinéad O'Connor - 4:03
 "Bizarre Love Triangle" - New Order - 3:56
 "Suspicion of Love" - Chris Isaak - 3:59
 "Liar, Liar" - Debbie Harry - 3:01
 "Time Bums" - Ziggy Marley and the Melody Makers - 4:37
 "Devil Does Your Dog Bite?" - Tom Tom Club - 3:40
 "Goodbye Horses" - Q. Lazzarus - 3:08
 "Queen of Voudou" - Voodooist Corporation - 3:39
 "Too Far Gone" - The Feelies - 3:32
 "You Don't Miss Your Water" - Brian Eno - 3:47

Charts

Album

Singles

References

1988 soundtrack albums
Comedy film soundtracks
Reprise Records soundtracks